The Little River flows through Little River, South Carolina, briefly touching the border with North Carolina before emptying into the Atlantic Ocean at the Little River Inlet. A large portion of the river forms part of the Atlantic Intracoastal Waterway.  Due to USGS weather buoy off Little River Inlet, the Little River Inlet is often referred to in weather forecasts.

See also
List of rivers in North Carolina
List of rivers in South Carolina
Waterways forming and crossings of the Atlantic Intracoastal Waterway

References

Rivers of Horry County, South Carolina
Rivers of North Carolina
Rivers of South Carolina